Nahid Kiani (born 1 August 1998 in Isfahan) is an Iranian taekwondo athlete. She won bronze medals at the 2016 Asian Championships and 2018 Asian Games.
She has been licensed to compete in the 2020 Summer Olympics in Tokyo.

References

External links
 
 

1998 births
Living people
Iranian female taekwondo practitioners
Asian Games medalists in taekwondo
Medalists at the 2018 Asian Games
Asian Games bronze medalists for Iran
Taekwondo practitioners at the 2018 Asian Games
Asian Taekwondo Championships medalists
Taekwondo practitioners at the 2020 Summer Olympics
Olympic taekwondo practitioners of Iran
Islamic Solidarity Games competitors for Iran